PlayerScale, Inc. is a Belmont-based gaming infrastructure provider. As of 23 May 2013 it operates as a subsidiary of Yahoo!, but it is still functioning as a stand-alone business unit.

Player.IO 

PlayerScale's Player.IO is a platform for online games. It works across consoles, the web, PCs, Macs, and on mobile phones. Player.IO is used on a daily basis by an estimated 150 million people worldwide. It works with various programming languages, including C++, Java, .NET, Objective-C, HTML5, Unity, Flash, iOS and Android. The platform includes payment processing, online chat, analytics, virtual currencies, distributed caching, authentication, social login, leaderboards, localization, among other things.

Everybody Edits 

One of the Player.IO showcase projects is the maze-based platform game Everybody Edits. During his lecture at the 2011 Flash Gaming Summit, PlayerScale chief product officer and Player.IO co-founder Benjaminsen revealed that the game, initially published on Flash game portal Newgrounds, had accumulated around 250 thousand registered users in seven months and was making $10,000 monthly. In March 2019, the game suffered a data breach, exposing 871 thousand unique email addresses, alongside usernames and IP addresses. In July 2019, another data breach occurred, leaking 882 unique email addresses, usernames and passwords in plaintext, along with in-game report files.

See also 

 DeNA
 GREE
 List of mergers and acquisitions by Yahoo!
 Yahoo! Games

References

External links 

 Old PlayerScale website at the Internet Archive
 Player.IO website

Internet properties established in 2009

Yahoo! acquisitions